Platylophus may refer to 

Platylophus (bird), a genus of birds in the family Corvidae
Platylophus (plant), a genus of plant in the family Cunoniaceae